Swamp Creek is a stream in Preble County, Ohio, in the United States.

Swamp Creek was named for the marshy land on its upper course.

Location

Mouth: Confluence with Twin Creek in Preble County northeast of Lewisburg 
Origin: Montgomery County northwest of Dayton

See also
List of rivers of Ohio

References

Rivers of Preble County, Ohio
Rivers of Ohio